Andrew John Donald (born 11 May 1957) is a former New Zealand rugby union player. A halfback, Donald represented Wanganui at a provincial level, and was a member of the New Zealand national side, the All Blacks, from 1981 to 1984. He played 20 matches for the All Blacks including seven internationals.

References

1957 births
Living people
Rugby union players from Whanganui
People educated at Whanganui Collegiate School
New Zealand rugby union players
New Zealand international rugby union players
Rugby union scrum-halves
Wanganui rugby union players